Embrace the Death is a rough mix and the fifth studio album by Asphyx. It was recorded in 1990 and intended as their first album, but it was not released. In 1996, Century Media Records eventually released this album, including the Mutilating Process EP.

Track listing

Personnel
Theo Loomans - vocals, bass guitar
Eric Daniels - guitar
Bob Bagchus - drums

References

Asphyx albums
1996 albums
Century Media Records albums